is a Japanese professional baseball player. He was born on January 11, 1991. He debuted in 2011 for the Hokkaido Nippon-Ham Fighters. He had 23 stolen bases in 2013.

References

Living people
1991 births
Baseball people from Fukuoka Prefecture
Japanese baseball players
Nippon Professional Baseball infielders
Hokkaido Nippon-Ham Fighters players
2015 WBSC Premier12 players